Camerunia orphne is a moth of the family Eupterotidae first described by William Schaus in 1893. It is found in Cameroon, Gabon and Sierra Leone.

References

Moths described in 1893
Janinae
Moths of Africa
Fauna of Gabon